Maria Beale Fletcher (born June 23, 1942) is an American beauty pageant contestant who was Miss America 1962.

Early life and education
Fletcher was born to dancing duo Charles "Beale" and Margaret Gatley Fletcher, who were the founders of the Fletcher School of Dance and the Land of the Sky Civic Ballet. She has one brother, Walter, and two sisters, Margaret and Bonnie.

She is from Asheville, North Carolina, and was a graduate of A.C. Reynolds High School. She worked as a Radio City Music Hall Rockette prior to winning the Miss America crown. After winning Miss America, Fletcher used her earned scholarship towards a degree in French from Vanderbilt University.

Pageantry
She was the Miss America preliminary competition swimsuit winner, and her overseas tour included visits to 31 Army hospitals and Servicemen's Clubs. For the talent competition, she tap danced to a recording of herself singing “Somebody Loves Me.” She remains  the only Miss North Carolina to be crowned Miss America.

Career
During the late 1960s, Fletcher served as co-host of The Noon Show on Nashville, Tennessee, television station WSM.

References 

Living people
Miss America winners
People from Asheville, North Carolina
1942 births
Miss America Preliminary Swimsuit winners
The Rockettes
American female dancers
American dancers
Miss North Carolina winners